Kahe Naa Kahe is a Hindi Indian soap opera created by Ekta Kapoor for the network 9X. The show premiered on 12 November 2007 and stars Krystal D'Souza and Karan Hukku. The show ended on 3 July 2008 and was replaced by Kahaani Hamaaray Mahaabhaarat Ki.

Plot
The show revolves Kinjal (Krystal D'Souza) who dreams of love and marriage like an ordinary Indian girl but with a difference. The show explores how her mother Urmila supports her dreams in leading her life and in making her daughter well good to lead her life. The show also explores Kanav (Karan Hukku) who is a rich spoilt brat and how he falls in love with Kinjal.

Cast
 Krystal D'Souza / Wasna Ahmed as Kinjal Pandey
 Karan Hukku as Kanav
 Reshmi Ghosh/ Madhura Naik as Neena
 Muni Jha as Sudhir Pandey
 Vaishnavi Mahant as Urmila Pandey
 Chinky Jaiswal as Raina

References

External links
 Production website
 

Balaji Telefilms television series
9X (TV channel) original programming
2007 Indian television series debuts
Indian drama television series
Indian romance television series
Indian television soap operas
Television shows set in Mumbai
2008 Indian television series debuts